The Pedra Selada State Park is a state park in the state of Rio de Janeiro, Brazil.

Location

The Pedra Selada State Park lies in the municipalities of Resende and Itatiaia, Rio de Janeiro.
The park provides opportunities for visitors to use the area for recreation, education and research, and contributes to the rural economy in tourism-related businesses.
A well-marked trail leads to the peak, from which there is a 360o degree view of the surrounding country.

Environment

Vegetation includes remnants of Atlantic Forest, Araucaria Forests and alpine meadows.
The state park forms part of an important ecological corridor with the Itatiaia National Park and other nearby public and private conservation units, which protects the source of rivers feeding some of the main rivers of the southeast – the Paraná and Paraíba do Sul – and contributes to preserving the mountain chain in which the Pedra Selada is located.

History 

The Pedra Selada State Park was created by state decree 43.640 of 15 June 2012.
The objective is to preserve populations of native plants and animals, and to provide refuges for migratory species.
It was the first fully protected state-level conservation unit in the Mantiqueira Mountains.
It is part of the Mantiqueira Mosaic of conservation units.
The consultative council was create on 15 August 2014.
The management plan came into effect in 2014.

Notes

Sources

State parks of Brazil
Protected areas of Rio de Janeiro (state)
2012 establishments in Brazil